Dan Wagaluka (born 25 December 1986) is a Ugandan football midfielder who plays for Nyamityobora FC.

References

1986 births
Living people
Ugandan footballers
Uganda international footballers
SC Villa players
Uganda Revenue Authority SC players
Azam F.C. players
APR F.C. players
Soana FC players
A.F.C. Leopards players
Lweza FC players
LLB Académic FC players
Maroons FC players
Association football midfielders
Ugandan expatriate footballers
Expatriate footballers in Tanzania
Ugandan expatriate sportspeople in Tanzania
Expatriate footballers in Rwanda
Ugandan expatriate sportspeople in Rwanda
Expatriate footballers in Kenya
Ugandan expatriate sportspeople in Kenya
Expatriate footballers in Burundi
Ugandan expatriate sportspeople in Burundi
People from Iganga District